Joseph Rabban (old Malayalam: Issuppu Irappan, also Yusuf/Oueseph Rabban) was a prominent Jewish merchant/aristocrat in the entrepôt of Kodungallur (Muyirikkottu) on the Malabar Coast, India in early 11th century AD.

According to the Jewish copper plates of Cochin (c. 1000 AD), a charter issued by the Chera king at Kodungallur, Rabban was granted the rights of merchant guild anjuman/hanjamana along with several other trade rights and aristocratic privileges. He was exempted from all payments made by other settlers in the city of Muyirikkottu to the king (at the same time extending to him all the rights of the other settlers). These rights and privileges were given perpetuity to all his descendants. Anjuman was a south Indian merchant guild organised by Jewish, Christian, and Islamic merchants from West Asian countries.

Rabban's descendants continued to have prominence over other Jews of the Malabar coast for centuries. A conflict broke out between descendants, Joseph Azar, and his brother Aaron Azar in the 1340s.

References

 Blady, Ken. Jewish Communities in Exotic Places. Northvale, NJ: Jason Aronson Inc., 2000. pp. 115–130.

External links

Cochin Jews
History of Kerala
Indian Jews
Mizrahi Jews
People of the Kodungallur Chera kingdom
10th-century Jews
11th-century Jews
10th-century Indian people
11th-century Indian people
10th-century merchants
11th-century merchants